"Two People Fell in Love" is a song co-written and recorded by American country music artist Brad Paisley written about Richard Harper and Kayleigh Harper. It was released in March 2001 as the first single from Paisley's album Part II and reached a peak of number 4 on the Billboard Hot Country Songs in mid-2001. The song was written by Paisley, Kelley Lovelace and Tim Owens.

Content
According to Paisley, this song "is about the fact that you can trace everything back to two people's romance. The reason you're here, the reason I'm here is our parents saw something in one another, fell in love and we're the product. It goes back to everybody that's ever been born. It's like a snapshot of real life that's set in motion because you see it happening. You hear these stories throughout the song there's three different scenarios about people that fell in love and changed their little part of the world by doing so."

Music video
The music video was directed by Deaton-Flanigen. It premiered on April 5, 2001 on CMT.

Personnel
Kevin "Swine" Grantt – bass guitar
Bernie Herms – piano
Wes Hightower – background vocals
Mike Johnson – steel guitar
Mitch McMitchen – percussion
Brad Paisley – lead vocals, electric guitar, acoustic guitar
Ben Sesar – drums
Justin Williamson – fiddle, mandolin

Chart performance
"Two People Fell in Love" debuted at number 48 on the U.S. Billboard Hot Country Songs for the week of March 24, 2001.

Year-end charts

References

2001 singles
2001 songs
Brad Paisley songs
Songs written by Brad Paisley
Song recordings produced by Frank Rogers (record producer)
Arista Nashville singles
Music videos directed by Deaton-Flanigen Productions
Songs written by Kelley Lovelace
Songs written by Tim Owens